Parys Sharron Haralson (January 24, 1984 – September 13, 2021) was an American professional football player who was a linebacker in the National Football League (NFL). He was drafted by the San Francisco 49ers in the 5th round (140th overall) in the 2006 NFL Draft. He played college football for the Tennessee Volunteers as a defensive end.

Early years
Haralson attended Madison Central High School in Madison, Mississippi. He was an All-American selection by Borderwars.com, Super Prep, Max Emfinger and Prep Star as a senior. He was a member of the Jackson Clarion-Ledger's Dandy Dozen prospects in Mississippi. He was a two-time Class 5A All-State and three-time All-Metro choice. He helped Madison Central to the state title as sophomore with a 15-0 record, while his junior (9-2) and senior (10-3) teams also advanced to the playoffs. He recorded 148 tackles, 10 sacks and one interception as a senior. As a junior, Haralson posted 80 tackles, 12 sacks and two interceptions.

College career
At the University of Tennessee in 2002, he played in thirteen games for the Volunteers as a reserve defensive end. He came up with 25 tackles (14 solos), a 15-yard sack and two stops for losses of 20 yards. He also had a quarterback pressure. He was a Freshman All-SEC pick by the Knoxville News Sentinel. He earned SEC Freshman Academic Honor Roll recognition.

In 2003, he moved into the starting lineup at left defensive end during the season’s fourth game against South Carolina. He finished with 44 tackles (30 solos). He tied for the team lead with 4.5 sacks and had 14.5 stops for losses of 62 yards. He recovered a fumble and made ten quarterback pressures. He also deflected a pass.

In 2004, he started twelve games at left defensive end, coming off the bench against Georgia. He was the team captain and an All-SEC second-team choice. He recorded 43 tackles (34 solos) and ranked second in the conference with seven sacks and 13.5 stops for losses of 53 yards. He tied the school season-record with 21 quarterback pressures. He caused and recovered two fumbles, returning one 18 yards for a touchdown.

In 2005, Haralson started all year at left defensive end and finished the year as an All-SEC second-team selection. He recorded 45 tackles (33 solos). He led the team and ranked fourth in the conference with 8.5 sacks. He finished third in the SEC with 16.5 stops for losses of 78 yards, the eighth-best season total in school history. He was credited with twelve quarterback pressures. He recovered two fumbles, returning one 17 yards. He had three forced fumbles and deflected a pass.

Haralson majored in sociology at Tennessee.

Professional career

San Francisco 49ers
Haralson was selected by the San Francisco 49ers in the fifth round (140th overall) in the 2006 NFL Draft. In his rookie season, he played in seven games, recording four tackles. He made his NFL debut versus the St. Louis Rams on September 17. In 2007, Haralson started 11 games from 16 appearances and made 42 tackles and 2.5 sacks, his first solo sack coming at the Seattle Seahawks on November 12.  He finished the 2008 season leading the 49ers with 8 sacks.  Haralson also led the NFC West in sacks in 2008.

In April 2009, Haralson signed a four-year contract extension with the 49ers.

New Orleans Saints
On August 26, 2013, Haralson was traded from the San Francisco 49ers to the New Orleans Saints. He had 30 tackles and 3½ sacks during the 2013 season.  He was injured in the Saints' first playoff game and was unable to play in their second one.

In the opening game of the 2014 season, in addition to his usual defensive role, Haralson came in for two plays at fullback, serving as a lead blocker for Khiry Robinson, who scored a touchdown behind Haralson's block in the second quarter.  It was Haralson's first time to play offense in his entire football career.

Death
Haralson died on September 13, 2021. At the time of his death, Parys worked in sales for a San Francisco-based startup. In March 2022, it was revealed that the Santa Clara County Medical Examiner-Coroner’s Office determined Haralson died of a stroke caused by a "rupture of (a) cerebrovascular malformation".

References

External links

New Orleans Saints bio

1984 births
2021 deaths
People from Flora, Mississippi
American football linebackers
Tennessee Volunteers football players
San Francisco 49ers players
New Orleans Saints players
People from Madison, Mississippi
Players of American football from Mississippi